A bowel resection or enterectomy (enter- + -ectomy) is a surgical procedure in which a part of an intestine (bowel) is removed, from either the small intestine or large intestine. Often the word enterectomy is reserved for the sense of small bowel resection, in distinction from colectomy, which covers the sense of large bowel resection. Bowel resection may be performed to treat gastrointestinal cancer, bowel necrosis, severe enteritis, diverticular disease, Crohn's disease, endometriosis, ulcerative colitis, or bowel obstruction due to scar tissue. Other reasons to perform bowel resection include traumatic injuries and to remove polyps when polypectomy is insufficient, either to prevent polyps from ever becoming cancerous or because they are causing or threatening bowel obstruction, such as in familial adenomatous polyposis, Peutz–Jeghers syndrome, or other polyposis syndromes. Some patients require ileostomy or colostomy after this procedure as alternative means of excretion. Depending on which part and how much of the intestines are removed, there may be digestive and metabolic challenges afterward, such as short bowel syndrome.

Types

Types of enterectomy are named according to the relevant bowel segment:

Anatomy 
The anatomy and surgical technique for bowel resection varies based on the location of the removed segment and whether or not the surgery is due to malignancy.

Medical Indications

Cancer 
Small bowel or colon cancer may require surgical resection.

Small bowel cancer often presents late in the course due to non-specific symptoms and has poor survival rates. Risk factors for small bowel cancer include genetically inherited polyposis syndromes, age over sixty years, and history of Crohn's or Celiac disease. Cases that present before stage IV show survival benefit from surgical resection with clear margins. It is recommended that surgical resection also include lymph node sampling of a minimum of 12 nodes with some groups extolling more extensive resection. When evaluation determines cancer to be stage IV, surgical intervention is no longer curative, and is only used for symptom relief.

Colon cancer is the third most common cancer and the second most common cause of cancer death in the USA. Due to its prevalence, screening protocols have been created for prevention of disease. Screening colonoscopies with or without polypectomy have been shown to decrease cancer morbidity and mortality. When cancer is more advanced and polypectomy is not possible surgical resection is necessary. Using imaging and pathologic evaluation of resected tissue the tumor may be staged using AJCC stages. Surgical resection of tumors for staging and for curative purposes requires removal of local blood vessel and lymph nodes. Standard lymph node resection includes three consecutive levels of lymph nodes and is known as a D3 lymphadenectomy. In addition to surgery adjuvant chemotherapy may be used to decrease risk of recurrence. Chemotherapy is standard with stage III cancer, case dependant in stage II and palliative in stage IV. Diet high in processed food and surgery drinks has also been shown to increase recurrence of stage III colon cancer.

Bowel obstruction. 
Bowel obstructions are commonly secondary to adhesions, hernias, or cancer. Bowel obstruction can be an emergency requiring immediate surgery. Original testing and imaging include blood tests for electrolyte levels, and abdominal X-rays or CT scans. Treatment often begins with IV fluids to correct electrolyte imbalances. Obstructions may be complicated by ischemia or perforation of the bowel. These cases are surgical emergencies and often require bowel resection to remove the cause of obstruction. Adhesions are a common causes of obstruction, and frequently resolve without surgery.

Other causes of bowel obstruction include volvulus, strictures, inflammation and intussusception. This is not an exhaustive list.

Perforation 
Bowel perforation presents with abdominal pain, free air in the abdomen on standing X-ray, and sepsis. Depending on the cause and size, perforations may be medically or surgically managed. Some common causes of perforation are cancer, diverticulitis, and peptic ulcer disease.

When caused by cancer, bowel perforation typically requires surgery, including resection of blood and lymph supply to the cancerous area when possible. When perforation is at the site of the tumor, the perforation may be contained in the tumor and self resolve without surgery. However, surgery may be required later for the malignancy itself. Perforation before the tumor usually requires immediate surgery due to release of fecal material into the abdomen and infection.

Perforated diverticulitis often requires surgery due to risks of infection or recurrence. Recurrent diverticulitis may required resection even in the absence of perforation. Bowel resection or repair is typically initiated earlier in patients with signs of infection, the elderly, immunocompromised, and those with severe comorbidities.

Peptic ulcer disease may cause perforation of the bowel but rarely requires bowel resection. Peptic ulcer disease is caused by stomach acid overwhelming the protection of mucous production. Risk factors include H. pylori infection, smoking, and NSAID use. The standard treatment is medical management, endoscopy followed by surgical omental patch repair. In rare cases where omental patch fails bowel resection may become necessary.

Traumatic injuries, whether blunt force such as car accidents or penetrating wounds such as gunshot wounds, or stabbings, may also cause bowel perforation or ischemia requiring emergency surgery. Initial evaluation in trauma includes a FAST ultrasound exam followed by contrast CT abdomen in stable patients. The most common bowel injury in trauma is perforation and is repaired rather than resected if the injury involves less than half the bowel circumference and does not involve loss of blood supply. Resection is indicated with more extensive or ischemic injuries.

Ischemia 
Bowel ischemia is caused by decreased or absent blood flow through the Celiac, Superior Mesenteric, and Inferior Mesenteric arteries or any combination thereof. Untreated acute mesenteric ischemia can cause bowel necrosis in the affected area. This requires emergent surgery as survival without endovascular or operative intervention is around 50%. Ischemic bowel injury often requires multiple surgeries days apart to allow bowel recovery and increase odds of successful anastomosis.

Complications

Anastomotic leaks/Dehiscence 
An anastomotic leak is a fault in the surgical connection between the two remaining sections of bowel after a resection is performed. This allows the bowel contents to leak into the abdomen. Anastomotic leaks may cause infection, abscess development, and organ failure if untreated. Surgical steps are taken to prevent leaks when possible. These include creating anastomoses with minimal tension on the connection and aligning the bowel to prevent twisting of the bowel at the anastomosis. However, it is believed that most leaks are caused by poor healing, not surgical technique. Risk factors for poor healing of anastomosis include obesity, diabetes mellitus, and smoking. Treatment of the leak includes antibiotics, placement of a drain near the leak or developing abscess, stenting of the anastomosis, surgical repair, or creating of an ileostomy or colostomy.

Anastomotic Strictures 
Strictures may form at the site of anastomosis caused by scarring down of the bowel wall.

Anastomotic ulcers 
Ulcerations may form at the site of anastomosis, especially in the proximal small intestine or in cases of cancer.

Internal and Incisional hernias 
Any abdominal surgery may result in an incisional hernia where the abdomen was accessed. When colon is resected hernias may form through the mesenteric defect.

Adhesions and post-op SBO/BO 
A common complication of all abdominal surgeries is adhesions. Adhesions are bands of scar tissue that form after surgery or injury to the abdomen. They can displace or obstruct areas of the bowel. Approximately 1 in 5 emergency surgeries are due to adhesive bowel obstruction. When possible this is managed without surgery with IV fluids, and NG tube to drain the stomach and intestines, and bowel rest (not eating) until the obstruction resolves. If signs of bowel ischemia or perforation are present then emergency surgery is required. Laparoscopic adhesiolysis is the most common surgery used when bowel rest and medical management fail to resolve the obstruction.

Short Bowel Syndrome 
When large amounts of small bowel are resected it can cause short bowel syndrome. Short bowel syndrome is a failure of absorption of nutrients due to resection of portions of the small bowel. It can be limited to a single nutrient or it can be total malabsorption. If the distal ileum is resected it commonly causes a mild form of short bowel syndrome with deficiency of only vitamin B12. When the entire small bowel is resected it can cause chronic complications.

The acute form lasts up to one month following bowel resection. Symptoms include diarrhea, malabsorption, and metabolic derangements. This is treated primarily by IV fluids and electrolyte replacement. Acute short bowel syndrome is followed by the adaptation phase which can last up to two years. During this time the small bowel slows movement of bowel contents to allow for more absorption. About half of all patients with short bowel syndrome progress to chronic disease.  Chronic short bowel syndrome may require total parenteral nutrition and chronic central line use. These may cause complications such as bacteremia and sepsis. Other complications of short bowel syndrome are chronic diarrhea or high output from the ostomy site, intestinal failure associated liver disease, and electrolyte level abnormalities.

Short bowel syndrome is rare and usually follows extensive ischemic bowel caused by internal hernias, volvulus, or mesenteric ischemia where the remaining small bowel is under 200 cm long.

See also
 Gastrectomy

References

External links
 Description of the procedure

Digestive system surgery
Surgical oncology
Surgical removal procedures